Lumbricalis  may refer to:
 the lumbrical muscles

Species Latin names
 Amphisbaena lumbricalis, Vanzolini, 1996, a worm lizard species in the genus Amphisbaena
 Asteriacites lumbricalis, a five-rayed fossil found in rocks : see Asteriacites
 Euphorbia lumbricalis, L.C. Leach, 1986, a plant species in the genus Euphorbia
 Typhlops lumbricalis, a blind snake species